The Bluejacket's Manual is the basic handbook for United States Navy personnel.  First issued in 1902 to teach recruits about naval procedures and life and offer a reference for active sailors, it has become the "bible" for Navy personnel, providing information about a wide range of Navy topics.  The current version, issued in 2017, is the 25th Edition and is given to all enlistees.

History 
Before 1902, the Navy had at least two books for training young men in naval procedure. Seamanship, by Captain Alfred Thayer Mahan, was the primary textbook about seamanship at the United States Naval Academy but was not used by enlisted men; many sailors at the time were still illiterate and in any case, the oral traditions and procedures of petty officers were the basis of enlisted sailors' education.  The Seaman's Handbook by LCDR Stephen B. Luce, saw general use in the Merchant Marine, but less in the Navy.

1902 saw the first publication of The Bluejacket's Manual, written by Lieutenant Ridley McLean, as well as the Recruit's Handy Book. Every enlistee received the latter, and by World War I, both were being issued to every recruit. The Handy Book was discontinued in the 1920s.

Some manuals published between 1903 and early 1915 have inconsistent edition numbering.  The 1903, 1905, 1907, and 1908 were considered the 2nd, 3rd, 4th, and 5th editions by the authors and the Naval Institute. In 1914, Franklin Publishing was contracted to publish the 1914 and 1915 book and pamphlet manuals. Because 1914 was the first time Franklin published the manual, they published their edition as the First Edition, the early 1915 version as the 2nd, and the late 1915 one as the 3rd. A single numbering system was restored with the 3rd edition, late 1915 Manual.

Centennial Edition
The 2002 Centennial Edition, also called the 23rd Edition, saw several modifications, including a reversion to its original title: Bluejacket's.  The "Navy Education and Training" chapter was expanded, and the "Naval Missions and Heritage" chapter was added.

The current (25th) edition's official author is retired Commander Thomas J. Cutler, who called the work a "collaborative effort".

Early editions

Later editions

WWII Editions

Post-war editions

References

Handbooks and manuals
Publications established in 1902
Military training books
United States Naval Institute
United States Navy publications